Stenus pauperculus is a species of water skater in the beetle family Staphylinidae. It is found in North America.

References

Further reading

 

Steninae
Articles created by Qbugbot